Yang Lie (born 13 October 1952) is a Taiwanese singer and actor.

Yang Lie has filmed a public service announcement with Dwagie meant to draw attention to stray cats in Taiwan. During the 2012 Taiwan legislative election, Yang represented the Democratic Progressive Party as its candidate in Taipei 1 against Ting Shou-chung. A review of the film  (2015) praised his performance.

Selected filmography
Unique Flavor (2008)
In a Good Way (2013)
Prince of Wolf (2016)
Refresh Man (2016)
In the Family (2017)
Pigeon Tango (2017)

References

1952 births
Living people
Taiwanese male television actors
Taiwanese male film actors
21st-century Taiwanese male actors
Taiwanese male singers
20th-century Taiwanese male  singers